Tatárjárás is a Hungarian word, meaning literally "Passing of the Tatars".

It may refer to:
 The Mongol invasion of Hungary in 1241-42 (see Mongol invasion of Europe).
 An operetta by Emmerich Kálmán, titled in English "The Gay Hussars" or "Autumn Manoeuvres".
 Tartar Invasion, a 1917 Hungarian film

Hungarian words and phrases
13th century in Hungary